Danish Sign Language (DTS) is the sign language used in Denmark.

Classification
Henri Wittmann (1991) assigned DSL to the French Sign Language family because of similarities in vocabulary. Peter Atke Castberg studied deaf education in Europe for two years (1803–1805), including at l'Épée's school in Paris, and founded the first deaf school in Denmark in 1807, where Danish Sign Language (DTS) developed. The exact relationship between DTS and Old French Sign Language (VLSF) is not known; Castberg was critical of l'Épée's 'methodical signs' and also receptive to local sign language in 1807, and may thus have introduced signs from VLSF to a pre-existing local language (or home sign(s)) rather than derived DTS from VLSF itself. In any case, Castberg introduced a one-handed manual alphabet in 1808 that was based on the Spanish manual alphabet. In 1977, the Danish Deaf Association adopted 'the international manual alphabet', which was an almost exact copy of the American manual alphabet, with minor differences and additional signs for the æ, ø and å.

Norwegian Sign Language is generally thought to be a descendant of DSL. However, it may well be a mixture of DSL and indigenous sign, parallel to the situation between Swedish Sign Language and Finnish Sign Language. 

Icelandic Sign Language is closer; 37% of a set of analyzed signs (Aldersson 2006) were completely different in structure and a further 16% were similar but not the same. Faroese Sign Language and Greenlandic Sign Language are more clearly dialects of DSL.

References

External links
 Ordbog over Dansk Tegnsprog A free online DSL dictionary.
 Aldersson, Russell R. and Lisa J. McEntee-Atalianis. 2007. A Lexical Comparison of Icelandic Sign Language and Danish Sign Language. Birkbeck Studies in Applied Linguistics Vol 2. A Lexical Comparison of Icelandic Sign Language and Danish Sign Language

Sign Language Studies | October 1, 2008 | Aldersson, Russell R; McEntee-Atalianis, Lisa J | 700+ words

French Sign Language family
Danish Sign Language family
Languages of Denmark
Languages of the Faroe Islands
Languages of Greenland